The Canon EOS 200D, known as the EOS Rebel SL2 in the Americas and EOS Kiss X9 in Japan, is a 24.2-megapixel upper entry-level midrange digital single-lens reflex camera made by Canon. It was announced on 28 June 2017, with a suggested retail price of US$549 for the body and US$699 with the Canon EF-S 18-55m f/4-5.6 IS STM lens. The European release price is significantly higher, at €599 for the body only, the equivalent of $671 at current conversion rates (but this price may include VAT).

The model features an APS-C CMOS sensor, Dual Pixel CMOS AF, DIGIC 7 image processor, ISO 100-25600 range, optical viewfinder with a 9-point AF system, 7.7 cm (3.0 inch) 1040k dot articulated touchscreen, 1080p60 video with microphone input, and built-in Wi-Fi, NFC, and Bluetooth. It became available in July 2017, alongside Canon's parallel announcement of the 6D Mk II. It weighs 453 grams, including battery and memory card.

Features 
The Canon 200D shares a similar set of features with the Canon EOS 100D. Both models are the smallest DSLR cameras produced by Canon, described as "the smallest and lightest DSLR" and are upper entry-level DSLRs. However, the 200D has the improved Dual-pixel CMOS AF system and the improved DIGIC 7 image processor.

Features include:
 24.2 effective megapixel APS-C CMOS sensor
 DIGIC 7 image processor
 Continuous Shooting Speed of 5 fps
 ISO sensitivity 100–25600, expandable to 51200
 9-point AF system, with centre point AF cross type
 3-inch touch-screen monitor
 Liveview Mode, 100% coverage
 Pop-up flash

See also
Canon EOS 100D
Canon EOS 250D
Canon EOS 300D
Canon EOS 5D Mark II

References

External links 
 Official page
 Canon EOS 200D Review

200D
Cameras introduced in 2017